Călimăneşti may refer to several places in Romania:

Călimăneşti, a town in Vâlcea County
 Călimăneşti, a village in Fântânele Commune, Mureș County
 Călimăneşti, a village in Puieşti Commune, Vaslui County
 Călimăneşti, a village in Mărășești town, Vrancea County

and to:

Călimăneşti, a commune in Nisporeni district, Moldova